Frédéric Viret (18 February 1822 – 3 May 1898) was a French choirmaster, composer of sacred music and leader of a well-established society of amateur male and female choristers of high vocal range and very rare quality among most choristers in Paris.

Biography

A pupil of the masters of the Church of Saint-Merri and Saint-Roch, Viret was kapellmeister of the Imperial Church of Saint-Germain l'Auxerrois from 1854, with several scholarly associations appointing him a founding member of the "Société des sciences industrielles, Arts et Belles lettres de Paris" and the "Société libre des Beaux-Arts". Praised for his sensitivity, he was admired for his fine character, the warmth of his singing and the beauty of his voice.

At sixteen, he was deemed capable of directing the choir at Saint-Merri. He conducted masses performed by an orchestra composed of 150 artists together with scholar J. B. Stiegler, a member of the Bavarian Academy of Music whom he had met in Paris and accompanied to Germany while he perfected in the art of singing, and organist Johann Peter Cavallo with whom he had published Les Veillées des Salons, a  musical magazine of piano music and vocal scores.

Viret was also an autodidactic painter, poet and amateur photographer.

Selected works
Among the works that have most contributed to his reputation are: 
 Les Chants du Psalmiste (4th collection of psalms), a compendium of songs containing the first collection of the Psalms of David for four male voices
 Six Messes solennelles, for three and four voices.
 Soixante Motels, almost all unpublished excerpts from the repertory of the Imperial Church St-Germain l'Auxerrois.
 Un Recueil de cantiques à Marie
 Au bord d'un vaisseau, grand lyrical symphony for four male voices without accompaniment
 L'Egypte, symphonic ode for four male voices and female voices, without accompaniment
 Les Pionniers du genre humain, grand cantata for four male voices and female voices without accompaniment
 Les Veillées des salons, a collection of songs and cantilenas with piano accompaniment
 Trente Choeurs, for four male voices (4th collection of psalms) without accompaniment, a work awarded a gold medal

References

1822 births
1898 deaths
19th-century classical composers
Burials at Père Lachaise Cemetery
Classical composers of church music
French choral conductors
French male classical composers
French male conductors (music)
French Romantic composers
Sacred music composers
19th-century French male musicians